Concordia is an unincorporated community and census-designated place (CDP) located within Monroe Township, in Middlesex County, New Jersey, United States. The CDP is oriented around the age restricted gated community of Concordia. As of the 2010 United States Census, the CDP's population was 3,092.

Geography
According to the United States Census Bureau, the CDP had a total area of 1.065 square miles (2.759 km2), including 1.039 square miles (2.692 km2) of land and 0.026 square miles (0.067 km2) of water (2.43%).

Demographics

Census 2010

Census 2000
As of the 2000 United States Census there were 3,658 people, 2,180 households, and 1,351 families living in the CDP. The population density was 1,345.1/km2 (3,477.2/mi2). There were 2,341 housing units at an average density of 860.8/km2 (2,225.3/mi2). The racial makeup of the CDP was 98.74% White, 0.52% African American, 0.46% Asian, 0.05% from other races, and 0.22% from two or more races. Hispanic or Latino of any race were 0.33% of the population.

There were 2,180 households, out of which 0.2% had children under the age of 18 living with them, 60.5% were married couples living together, 1.2% had a female householder with no husband present, and 38.0% were non-families. 35.4% of all households were made up of individuals, and 33.3% had someone living alone who was 65 years of age or older. The average household size was 1.68 and the average family size was 2.05.

In the CDP the population was spread out, with 0.4% under the age of 18, 0.1% from 18 to 24, 1.0% from 25 to 44, 10.1% from 45 to 64, and 88.5% who were 65 years of age or older. The median age was 74 years. For every 100 females, there were 72.5 males. For every 100 females age 18 and over, there were 72.3 males.

The median income for a household in the CDP was $43,382, and the median income for a family was $51,949. Males had a median income of $54,615 versus $32,250 for females. The per capita income for the CDP was $36,962. About 0.9% of families and 1.9% of the population were below the poverty line, including none of those under age 18 and 2.2% of those age 65 or over.

References

Census-designated places in Middlesex County, New Jersey
Monroe Township, Middlesex County, New Jersey